The 2017 Men's EuroHockey Junior Championship II was the tenth edition of the Men's EuroHockey Junior Championship II, the second level of the men's European under-21 field hockey championships organized by the European Hockey Federation. It was held from 16 to 22 July 2017 in Saint Petersburg, Russia.

France won their first EuroHockey Junior Championship II title and were promoted to the 2019 Men's EuroHockey Junior Championship together with the other finalists Poland.

Qualified teams
The participating teams have qualified based on their final ranking from the 2014 competition.

Results

Preliminary round

Pool A

Pool B

Fifth to eighth place classification

Pool C
The points obtained in the preliminary round against the other team are taken over.

First to fourth place classification

Semi-finals

Third place game

Final

Statistics

Final standings

See also
2017 Men's EuroHockey Championship II
2017 Men's EuroHockey Junior Championship

References

Junior 2
Men's EuroHockey Junior Championship II
EuroHockey Junior Championship II
International field hockey competitions hosted by Russia
EuroHockey Junior Championship II
Men's EuroHockey Junior Championship II
Sports competitions in Saint Petersburg